The Kuk River (Iñupiaq: Kuuk) is a  long stream in the  North Slope Borough of the U.S. state of Alaska. The inlet links to the Chukchi Sea of the Arctic Ocean.

Kuuk means river in the Inuit language. Nineteenth century maps variously listed streams entering the Wainwright Inlet as "Koh", "Kong", "Tutua Wing", "Ku", "Kook", "Koo", and "Kee".

References

See also
List of rivers of Alaska

Rivers of North Slope Borough, Alaska
Rivers of Alaska
Drainage basins of the Chukchi Sea